Hologymnosus is a genus of wrasses native to the Indian Ocean and the western Pacific Ocean.

Species
The currently recognized species in this genus are:
 Hologymnosus annulatus (Lacépède, 1801) (ring wrasse)
 Hologymnosus doliatus (Lacépède, 1801) (pastel ringwrasse)
 Hologymnosus longipes (Günther, 1862) (sidespot longface wrasse)
 Hologymnosus rhodonotus J. E. Randall & Yamakawa, 1988 (redback longface wrasse)

References

 
Labridae
Marine fish genera
Taxa named by Bernard Germain de Lacépède